Le Moniteur des travaux publics et du bâtiment (Monitor of public works and buildings) is a French weekly magazine covering construction systems and architecture. Founded in 1903 by Louis Dubois, it belongs to a publishing house along with other specialized publications such as L'Usine nouvelle, Les Cahiers techniques du bâtiment, Négoce, Le Moniteur des Artisans, Le Moniteur Matériels and La Gazette des Communes.

Its mother company Infopro Digital is owned by TowerBrook Capital Partners. The magazine's headquarters are in Paris.

References

External links
 

1903 establishments in France
French-language magazines
Weekly magazines published in France
Magazines established in 1903
Magazines published in Paris
Professional and trade magazines